
Michael Leidig (born 19 April 1965) is a British journalist based in Vienna, Austria. He has worked for Austrian and international media in print and broadcast. He is also the owner of CEN, the news wire agency Central European News Ltd. He is the co-founder of the independent freelance journalism initiative the Fourth Estate Alliance (T4).

Central European News has been referred to by BuzzFeed as "The King of Bullsh*t News" due to a number of stories that CEN had been selling that Buzzfeed claimed were false. One such story BuzzFeed reported that CEN was selling was that 17 year old Noa Pothoven was killed by euthanasia, rather than the truth, which was that she had refused to be tube fed. CEN sued BuzzFeed over the story, alleging that it was attempting to damage CEN after it opened offices in London, and when the suit was dismissed, CEN filed an appeal which is under review in a New York Federal Court as of 2019.

Career 
Leidig moved to Austria in 1993 to take up a role as a news presenter with the ORF and in 1995 left to start his first agency, CEN. In 1996, he became editor of the monthly English language Vienna Reporter and in 1995 became editor of a daily Austrian English language newspaper Austria Today. He also produced English language news with a daily English section for Die Presse for several years, later taking over the layout, editorial and writing of a page a day in the Wiener Zeitung, the world's oldest still selling newspaper. CEN later launched other online news wire projects such as the Austrian Times that included an English food guide with Austrian chef Bernie Rieder.

In 2008, Leidig met Austrian charity worker Hannes Urban and they were involved in establishing the Austrian charity project Journalism Without Borders.

Leidig wrote The Girl in the Cellar - The Natascha Kampusch Story that was sold to Hodder & Stoughton.

Libel cases 

In 2011 a PR agent for the Kampusch family alleged that Leidig had falsified interviews for his book. The case attracted widespread media attention in Austria and internationally. Leidig won a full apology after an Austrian court ruled that the case brought against him had been "a deliberate attempt to damage sales of the book."

In April 2015 Leidig was again accused of producing fake news in two reports by online news portal BuzzFeed. In January 2016 he sued them in a federal court in New York for libel. The case alleges that two articles by BuzzFeed were a deliberate attempt at undermining the news agency which was a major supplier to BuzzFeed's UK rivals. In March 2019, the case was dismissed, on the grounds that "Buzzfeed argues that plaintiffs (Leidig) cannot show the falsity of the allegedly defamatory statements, and thus plaintiffs’ claims must fail. The court agrees."

CEN is currently appealing the decision and has published a book in an attempt to address the criticism and raised questions about BuzzFeed's motivation for attacking CEN.

References

British male journalists
Living people
Date of birth missing (living people)
Alumni of the University of Hull
1965 births